Monteiro is a municipality in the state of Paraíba in the Northeast Region of Brazil. It is the largest municipality in the state in terms of area.

See also
List of municipalities in Paraíba

References

Municipalities in Paraíba